Gordias Henry Plumb Gould (June 10, 1848 – June 9, 1919) was an American businessman, manufacturer, and politician from New York.

Life 
Gould was born on June 10, 1848 in Lyons Falls, New York. He was the son of Gordias H. Gould, who built the first steamboat in the Black River, and Mary Plumb.

Gould attended Fairfield Seminary and Lowville Academy. When he was 16, he drove a stage coach, later working with the tannery Snyder Brothers in Port Leyden for three years.

In 1869, Gould bought land on the Moose River and started manufacturing lumber. In 1874, he formed a co-partnership with Lyman R. Lyons and purchased more land. He built a mill in 1880 to manufacture pulp and manufactured lumber. In 1891, he purchased paper mills as well. He became president of the Gould Paper Company and the St. Regis Paper Company, with millions of dollars in capital and large timber holdings in New York and Canada. Gould was at one point the largest employer of labor in northern New York. He was also president and director of the Glenfield and Western Railroad Company, a director of the First National Bank of Utica, and a town supervisor of Lyonsdale for eight years. Gould was a mason.

In 1881, Gould was elected to the New York State Assembly as a Democrat, representing Lewis County. He served in the Assembly in 1882, 1885, 1891, and 1892. He was also  a delegate to the 1912 Democratic National Convention.

Gould was married three times. His first wife was Elizabeth Pritchard. After she died, he married Nellie Church. His third wife was Ella T. Lennox. He had two children, Harry P. Gould and Eleanor C. Tuttle.

He died on June 9, 1919 in Clifton Springs Sanitarium and was buried in the family plot at Port Leyden Cemetery.

References

External links 
 The Political Graveyard
 G. Henry P. Gould at Find a Grave

1848 births
1919 deaths
People from Lewis County, New York
American industrialists
Businesspeople from New York (state)
American company founders
19th-century American railroad executives
20th-century American railroad executives
Town supervisors in New York (state)
Democratic Party members of the New York State Assembly
19th-century American politicians
20th-century American politicians
Burials in New York (state)
American Freemasons